Sadabad (also Romanized as Sa‘dābād; also known as Sa‘idābād) is a village in Sang Bast Rural District, in the Central District of Fariman County, Razavi Khorasan Province, Iran. At the 2006 census, its population was 971, in 262 families.

References 

Populated places in Fariman County